Wang Tzu-sung (born 6 June 1978) is a Taiwanese baseball player who played for Uni-President Lions of Chinese Professional Baseball League. He retired in 2011 due to a shoulder injury, and is now serving as the Lions' infield fielding coach.

References

See also
Chinese Professional Baseball League
Uni-President Lions

1978 births
Living people
Uni-President 7-Eleven Lions players
Baseball players from Tainan
Uni-President 7-Eleven Lions coaches